The Deceased Management Advisory Group (DMAG)  was set up in April 2020 to provide the government of the UK with a central coordination point with the deceased management sector during the COVID-19 pandemic. It contributed to Government guidance and was signposted by Government  as a source of information for the funeral sector. 

DMAG comprises representatives from each of the following organisations:

 The Association of Private Crematoria and Cemeteries (APCC)
 Federation of Burial and Cremation Authorities (FBCA)
 Funeral Furnishing Manufacturers' Association (FFMA)
 Institute of Cemetery and Crematorium Management (ICCM)
 National Association of Funeral Directors (NAFD)
 National Society of Allied & Independent Funeral Directors (SAIF)
 The Cremation Society

References

External links 
 

COVID-19 pandemic in the United Kingdom